Fox 11 may refer to one of the following television stations in the United States affiliated with the Fox Broadcasting Company:

Current
KDFX-CD, Indio / Palm Springs, California (cable channel, broadcasts on virtual channel 33)
KIIT-CA, North Platte, Nebraska
KKFX-CD, Santa Maria, California (cable channel, broadcasts on virtual channel 24)
KMSB, Tucson, Arizona
KRXI-TV, Reno, Nevada
KTTV, Los Angeles, California (O&O)
WBKB-DT4, a digital subchannel of WBKB-TV in Alpena, Michigan
WCHS-DT2, a digital subchannel of WCHS-TV in Charleston, West Virginia (branded as Fox 11)
WLUK-TV, Green Bay, Wisconsin

Former
WVAH-TV, Charleston, West Virginia (1986-2021)